McCormick is an unincorporated community in Pope County, Illinois, United States.  Jackson Falls, a seasonal waterfall and climbing area, is located 4 miles (6.4 km) south of McCormick. 

C. L. McCormick (1919-1987), Illinois state representative and businessman, was born in McCormick.

Notes

Unincorporated communities in Pope County, Illinois
Unincorporated communities in Illinois